The String Octet in B major, Op. posth., was composed by Max Bruch for four violins, two violas, cello and double bass. Completed in 1920, the year of his death, it is his last work and would not be published until 1996. The work is also known under the name Concerto for String Orchestra (Octet).

Background 

The octet has its origins in a string quintet that was written in the first three months of 1919. Following a period of depression caused by the death of his wife Clara and the general dire state of defeated Germany, Bruch reworked the string quintet into an octet in 1920. Shortly after its completion, his health deteriorated further, and he died on 2 October.

Bruch dedicated the octet to his friend Willy Hess, a professor at the Royal Manchester College of Music. Hess, who had the autograph scores in his possession, played through the work with his students, and in 1936 ceded the performing rights to Bruch's eldest son Max Felix and his daughter-in-law Gertrude. Handwritten copies of the parts made by Gertrude have been discovered in the BBC Music Library, though it is unclear how they got there. The parts were incorrectly allocated the opus number 97.

The work was premiered in a live BBC broadcast from Daventry on the National network on 16 July 1937. Despite it being the first performance of a work by a famous composer, no mention was given in The Listener or the press. Only a short paragraph appeared in the Radio Times: "Max Bruch, whose Violin Concerto in G minor is known to all violinists, and whose Kol Nidrei is equally familiar to cellists, was made an Honorary Doctor of Music in the University of Cambridge, and all his life he was very proud of this distinction. He had a great admiration for Scottish and Welsh folk music, of which he published several arrangements for male and mixed choruses. Bruch died in 1920. His String Octet, which is receiving its first performance this afternoon, is still in manuscript. It was dedicated to Professor Willy Hess, of the Manchester Royal College of Music, who owned the performing rights until he ceded them about a year ago to Max Bruch's son and daughter-in-law."

For decades after the broadcast, nothing was heard of the work until Bruch's biographer Christopher Fifield began looking for it. The manuscript, which had been placed in the care of the Berlin-based publisher Rudolf Eichmann, turned up in the Austrian National Library in Vienna, where it is still held today. The work was first published by Simrock in 1996.

Structure 

The work is classical in structure, though it omits the conventional scherzo. It consists of three movements:

The work bears some similarity to Mendelssohn's String Octet, particularly in the structure of the first movement and the character of the third movement, which has much of Mendelssohn's "infectious exuberance". The two works differ in instrumentation however: Bruch substituted a double bass for a second cello.

Reception 
Lucy Miller Murray remarks that "one cannot help but wonder why this splendid work has been so overlooked except to note that it appeared in the heyday of the Second Viennese School and at the edges of Serialism." Violinist Julia Fischer has championed the piece, calling it "one of the most beautiful works ever" and "insanely romantic and incredibly fun".

Recordings

References

External links
 

Compositions by Max Bruch
1920 compositions
Compositions for octet
Compositions in B-flat major
Music with dedications